Merops is a large genus of bee-eaters, a group of birds in the family Meropidae, native to Africa, Asia, Australia and Europe. The members of this family are characterised by richly coloured plumage, slender bodies and usually elongated central tail feathers. They predominantly eat insects, especially bees, wasps and hornets, which are caught in the air.

All bee-eaters are in the genus Merops and subfamily Meropinae except for three Asiatic bearded bee-eaters in the subfamily Nyctyornithinae (in genera Nyctyornis and Meropogon). The genus Merops was introduced by the Swedish naturalist Carl Linnaeus in 1758 in the tenth edition of his Systema Naturae. The type species is the European bee-eater. The genus name is Ancient Greek for "bee-eater".

Taxonomy and systematics
Twenty-eight species are recognized:

Former species
Formerly, some authorities also considered the following species (or subspecies) as species within the genus Merops:
 Magpie-lark (as Merops picatus)

References

 
Meropidae
Bird genera
Taxa named by Carl Linnaeus